Macon is a surname. 

It may be derived from French Maçon or Mâcon meaning marsh dweller, or a variant of the occupational surname Mason.

People with this name

 Mark Macon (born 1969), former American professional basketball player 
 Max Macon (1915–1989), American Major League Baseball player and Minor League Baseball manager
 Robert C. Macon (1890–1980), general in the U.S. Army during World War II
 Uncle Dave Macon (1870–1952), American country musician, born David Harrison Macon
 Robert B. Macon (1859–1925), U.S. Representative from Arkansas
 Nathaniel Macon (1758–1837), American politician in the early republic and namesake for many of the U.S. places
 Gideon Macon (c. 1648–1702), early American settler and member of the House of Burgesses of Virginia
 Robert le Maçon (c. 1365–1443), chancellor of France, adviser to Charles VII and supporter of Joan of Arc